Birgit Ann-Marie Margareta Nordbring-Hertz, (16 May 1923 – 16 March 2020 in Lund, Sweden) was a Swedish scientist at Lund University known for her work on the interactions between fungi and nematodes.

Education 
Nordbring-Hertz graduated with a medical licentiate degree with a thesis on the opportunistic human pathogenic fungus, Candida albicans, 1956 at Lund University, and received a doctorate in microbiology in 1974 at the same university, working on nematode-trapping fungi. After her doctorate she took over responsibility for the department of microbial ecology, a position she held from 1975 until 1989. In 1987, she was promoted to professor at Lund University, and in 1989 she transitioned to an emeritus position. She was the first female professor at the natural science faculty at Lund University.

Research 
Nordbring-Hertz's research mainly dealt with a type of microfungi, so-called nematophagous fungi, that infect and digest nematodes. She concentrated on the nematode-trapping fungus Arthrobotrys oligospora. Nordbring-Hertz used scanning electron microscopy to study the trapping organs of A. oligospora. Her early research was concentrated on how trapping organs were induced, apart from nematode touching the hyphae also chemically by small peptides will induce trap formation. Her work was later focussed on specific recognition mechanisms, e.g. by lectins (carbohydrate-binding glycoproteins) on the trap surface that recognise specific carbohydrates on the nematode surface and start the infection process. Her research also examined volatile exudates from nematodes, the fungal plant pathogen Verticillium dahliae, and quantifying the presence of the fungus in soil ecosystems.

Selected publications

Personal life 
Nordbring-Hertz married in 1953 to a professor in electrical measurement technology, Hellmuth Hertz, and they had two sons, Thomas and Hans Hertz.

References

Swedish women scientists
1923 births
2020 deaths
Ecologists
Microbiologists
Lund University alumni
Academic staff of Lund University